Hinduism is practiced and preached by many Hindu organisations, each of which follows the variants and perspectives of all or particular philosophy propagated and transferred through generations by saints. It is a peaceful religion. Hinduism may be more of a custom or tradition of that part of the world which the great epics of Hinduism are supposed to depict. Hinduism is based on the Vedas, some of which are humanity's oldest inscriptions on life and spirituality. They differ on how to achieve life's ultimate goal – Atma Jnana or self-realization. Devotees can choose any path depending on their individual natures.

This is a list of notable organisations related to Hinduism, Hindu nationalism and Hindutva.

Bharat darshan

Aditya Vahini 
Akhil Vishv Hindu Ekta Manch
Akhil Bharatiya Akhara Parishad
Akonir Namghar
American Meditation Institute
Ananda Ashrama
Ananda Marga Pracaraka Samgha
Ananda World Brotherhood Colonies
Anbukkodimakkal Thirucchabai
List of Ayyavazhi organisations
Antarashtriya Hindu Parishad
Arsha Vidya Gurukulam
Art of Living Foundation
The Art of Living International Center
Arya Samaj
Arya Pratinidhi Sabha of Fiji
D.A.V. College Managing Committee
Gurukul Kangri University
Avadhoota Datta Peetham
Datta Yoga Centers
Banaras Hindu University
Bharat Sevashram Sangha
Bhartiya Gau Raksha Dal
Bihar School of Yoga
Bochasanwasi Akshar Purushottam Swaminarayan Sanstha
BAPS Charities
Mahanubhava
Marathi University Riddhapur
Brahma Kumaris
Adhyatmik Ishwariya Vishwa Vidyalaya
Brahma Kumaris World Spiritual University
Chinmaya Mission
Devaswom boards in Kerala
Divine Life Society
Divine Light Mission
Gaudiya Math
Gaudiya Mission
Gaudiya Vedanta Samiti
Gita Press
Hanuman Foundation
Himalayan Institute of Yoga Science and Philosophy
Hindu Aikya Vedi
Hindu American Foundation
Hindu Council UK
Hindu Council of Russia
Hindu Chaitanya Vaahini
Hindu Dharma Samudaya of Bhutan
Hindu Forum of Britain
The Hindu Group
Hindu Janajagruti Samiti
Hindu Munnani
Hindu Religious and Charitable Endowments Department (Tamil Nadu)
Hindu Rights Action Force (Malaysia)
Hindu Samhati
Hindu Satsang
Hindu Sena
Hindu Students Council
Hindu Yuva Vahini
Integral Yoga Institutes and Centers
International Society for Krishna Consciousness
Bhaktivedanta Book Trust
Bhaktivedanta College
Bhaktivedanta Hospital
Food for Life Global
ISKCON Food Relief Foundation
International Swaminarayan Satsang Mandal
International Swaminarayan Satsang Organisation
ISSO Seva
International Vedanta Society
Isha Foundation 
Italian Hindu Union
Jagadguru Kripalu Parishat
Radha Madhav Dham
Jagadguru Kripaluji Yog
Jivamukti Yoga
Kaginele Kanaka Guru Peetha
Kanchi Kamakoti Peetham
Kriya Yoga Institute
Kriya Yoga Centers
Mahanam Sampraday
Malaysia Hindudharma Mamandram
Mata Amritanandamayi Math
Narnarayan Dev Yuvak Mandal
National Council of Hindu Temples (UK)
National Hindu Students' Forum (UK)
Nikhil Manipuri Mahasabha
Nilachala Saraswata Sangha
O&O Academy
Pakistan Hindu Council
Pakistan Hindu Panchayat
Parisada Hindu Dharma Indonesia
Patanjali Yogpeeth
Radha Soami Satsang Beas
Radha Soami Satsang Sabha
Radha Swami Satsang, Dinod
Ramakrishna Math (a.k.a. Vedanta Society)
Ramakrishna-Vivekananda Center
Vedanta Society of New York
Vedanta Society of Southern California
Ramakrishna Mission
Ramakrishna Mission Institute of culture
Swami Vivekananda Yoga Anusandhana Samsthana
Rashtriya Swayamsevak Sangh (Sangh Parivar)
Akhil Bharatiya Vidyarthi Parishad
Bajrang Dal
Bharat Vikas Parishad
Bharatiya Kisan Sangh
Bharatiya Mazdoor Sangh
Ekal Vidyalaya
Hindu Jagran Manch
Saiva Siddhanta Church
Sanatan Dharma Maha Sabha (Trinidad and Tobago)
Sanatan Sanstha
Santhigiri Ashram
Sathya Sai Organization
Satsang (Deoghar)
School of Philosophy and Economic Science
Science of Identity Foundation
Science of Spirituality (a.k.a. Sawan Kirpal Ruhani Mission)
Self-Realization Fellowship
Yogoda Satsanga Society of India
Shree Shree Anandamayee Sangha
Shree Swaminarayan Gurukul Rajkot Sansthan
Sri Caitanya Prema Samsthana
Sri Caitanya Sangha
Sri Chaitanya Saraswat Math
Siddha Yoga Dham Associates Foundation
Sivananda Yoga Vedanta Centres
Society of Abidance in Truth
Sree Narayana Dharma Paripalana Yogam
Alwaye Advaita Ashram
Sree Narayana Trust
List of Sree Narayana Institutions
Sri Aurobindo Ashram
Auroville Foundation
Sri Aurobindo Ashram, Rewa
Sri Aurobindo International School, Hyderabad
Sri Chinmoy Centres
Sri Ramana Ashram
Sri Sri Radha Govindaji Trust
Sringeri Sharada Peetham
Swadhyay Parivar
Durga Vahini
Swaminarayan Mandir Vasna Sanstha
Tulsi Peeth Seva Nyas
Vishva Hindu Parishad
Vishwa Madhwa Maha Parishat
Vishwa Nirmala Dharma
Vishwa Hindu Mahasangh (World Hindu Federation)
World Vaisnava Association

Defunct organisations
Banga Mahila Vidyalaya
Hindu Maha Sabha (Fiji)
Manav Dharma Sabha
Paramahansa Mandali
Prarthana Samaj
Ratnagiri Hindu Sabha
Tattwabodhini Sabha
Theosophical Society of the Arya Samaj
Trust deed of Brahmo Sabha

See also

List of Hindu temples

References

 
Hindu
Organisations